Nizar bin Muhammad Nasar Nawar (1978-2002), an alleged member of the Tunisian Combat Group, was accused of carrying out the 2002 Ghriba synagogue bombing, after planning its execution while living in Montreal, Canada.

Life
Raised by his mother in Ben Gardane, Nizar Nawar was a "mediocre" student who never completed high school. His father, who moved to Lyon, France, in 1971, visited the family routinely, but was unable to help his son gain an entry visa to France in 1999, since he could not prove he had the financial capacity to support him.

Nizar Nawar was not considered religious, as he drank and wore un-Islamic clothing, while traveling to Libya to purchase cheap trinkets that he sold in Tunisian markets.

In 1999, Nizar Nawar told his family he was traveling to South Korea to work in restaurants. Nine months later he phoned his parents "very bitter, very angry", and explained he had no money and said the restaurant had refused to pay him. He asked them to help him fly back to Tunisia.

Upon returning to Tunisia, Nawar moved to Montreal, where he told his family he'd been accepted into a travel agency school.

In 2001, his father moved the remaining family members to France.

Nawar remained in Canada until February 2002, when he and several others traveled to Tunisia to prepare for the attack. He told his family that the others were from the travel agency.

Attack

Nawar worked at a legitimate travel agency under the alias Seif el-Islam Ettounsi while in Tunisia, where he constructed the "crude" bomb for the attack himself. During this time, he often stayed with his uncle Belgasem Nawar, who purchased the truck that was eventually used in the bombing. Just before the attack, he mailed a letter to Al-Quds Al-Arabi in which he took responsibility for the attack in the name of al-Qaeda.

Early on 11 April 2002, he and a colleague drove the truck loaded with natural gas canisters behind a German tourist bus near the synagogue. Nawar then used a cell phone belonging to his brother, to phone Christian Ganczarski, whom he asked to pray for him. He also had a phone call with Khalid Sheikh Mohammed. After his colleague fled the scene on foot, Nawar detonated the explosives. The truck detonated at the front of the synagogue, killing 14 German tourists, five Tunisians, and two French nationals. More than 30 others were wounded.

Following the blast, Tunisian officials identified his remains through dental records. They initially labeled the explosion an accident, until they were made aware of the letter sent to the al-Quds media outlet and re-labeled it as an attack. His uncle was arrested shortly after the bombing.

Aftermath
Then Tunisian president Zine El Abidine Ben Ali replaced both ministers in charge of internal security two weeks after the attack, having Hedi M'henni replace Abdallah Kaabi as Minister of the Interior, and Mohamed Hedi ben Hassine replace Mohamed Ali Ganzaoui as head of National Security.

In June 2002, Sulaiman Abu Ghaith spoke on al-Jazeera to confirm that the attack was carried out by Nizar Nawar with al-Qaeda's help, since Nawar "could not see his Palestinian brothers killed while Jews walked freely in Djerba to enjoy themselves and practice their religion". The Boston Globe stated that his residence in Canada proved "that Canada, despite new antiterrorist measures approved by Parliament under intense pressure from the United States, remains an important haven for bin Laden's operatives"

Seven months after the attack, his parents, brother and brother-in-law were arrested in France under anti-terrorism laws, while authorities investigated if they had any connection to the bombing. There were reports that Nawar had written his brother a letter urging him to "finish what he had started, and die a martyr".

References

1978 births
2002 deaths
Suicide bombers
Criminals from Montreal
Suicides in Tunisia
Terrorism in Tunisia
People from Medenine Governorate
Tunisian emigrants to Canada